The  (French for "King's roman") was a typeface developed in France beginning in 1692. The name refers to Louis XIV who commissioned the design of the new typeface for use by the Royal Print Office.

The  stands as a landmark of typography in the Age of Enlightenment. The conception of the letterforms reflects a difference in attitude from the prevailing roman typefaces before it.

The  was not the first "constructed alphabet". Felice Feliciano was the first to recreate geometrically the alphabet of roman inscriptions, and published it in 1463 as Alphabetum Romanum Codex Vaticanus 6852. The , however, because of its allegiance to the grid, shows a distinct shift in style, with an increased emphasis on verticality and increased contrast between thick and thin elements, a style that influenced the Transitional typefaces of Pierre Simon Fournier and John Baskerville.

The letterforms were the work of the Royal Academy's Bignon Commission as part of its investigation of French typography and printing for the compilation of the Description of the Arts and Trades of France. The capital letters were drawn on 8×8 grids, the lowercase letters on rectangular grids. The committee's designs were engraved by Louis Simonneau. Punches for the metal type were cut by Philippe Grandjean, who took some liberty with his type, to moderate the cold geometry of the designs.

References

 Meggs, Philip B. (1998). A History of Graphic Design (Third ed.). John Wiley & Sons, Inc. pp. 108–09. .
 "Types With Plenty of Character", The New York Times, 2011-12-23. Retrieved on 2012-01-20.

History of printing
Transitional serif typefaces
Typography
Typefaces and fonts introduced in the 17th century